Statistics of Úrvalsdeild in the 1957 season.

Overview 
It was contested by 6 teams, and ÍA won the championship. ÍA's Þórður Þórðarson was the top scorer with 6 goals.

League standings

Results

References 

Úrvalsdeild karla (football) seasons
Iceland
Iceland
Urvalsdeild